My Song for You is a 1934 film directed by Maurice Elvey and starring Jan Kiepura. Kiepura sang the title song "My Song for You" written by Mischa Spoliansky and Frank Eyton. The song was released on an EP "Tell Me Tonight" (also a song by Spoliansky and Eyton) in 1957.

Plot
Arriving in Venice for a production of "Aida", young tenor Ricardo Gatti meets the attractive Mary, who has sneaked into the opera house in an attempt to get her fiancé hired as a pianist. Ricardo invites Mary to tea and she tells her story, describing her fiancé as her "brother". Captivated by her, the tenor uses his influence to obtain the job with the orchestra. However, filled with guilt at her deception, Mary breaks off her engagement and consents instead to marry her parents' choice, a wealthy society man. But just before the wedding, she changes her mind and marries Ricardo instead.

Cast
Jan Kiepura as Ricardo Gatti
Sonnie Hale as Charlie
Emlyn Williams as Theodore Bruckner
Aileen Marson as Mary Newberg
Gina Malo as Fifi
Muriel George as Mrs Newberg
George Merritt as Mr Newberg
Reginald Smith as Baron Johann Felix Kleeberg

Critical reception
The New York Times wrote, "the film is at its best, of course, while its star is attuning his magnificent tenor to a variety of classic arias. The musical high spots of the show are the "Ave Maria" of Gounod, which M. Kiepura sings impressively during a church wedding, and the "Celeste Aïda," which he rehearses during an amusing backstage sequence at the opera house while "Aïda" is being trundled through its paces"; and TV Guide called the film "charming in parts, this is a nicely done musical with some good detailed direction."

See also
 A Song for You (Ein Lied für Dich, German-language film, 1933)
 All for Love (Tout pour l'amour, French-language film, 1933)

References

External links

1934 films
1934 musical comedy films
British musical comedy films
British multilingual films
Cine-Allianz films
British black-and-white films
1934 multilingual films
1930s English-language films
1930s British films